The following is a list of organizations, both active and defunct, whose ideological beliefs are categorized as neo-Nazism. This includes political parties, terrorist cells, street gangs, social clubs, criminal groups, websites, religious sects, and other organizations alike.

Various white power skinhead groups as well as select factions of the Ku Klux Klan are listed only if they espouse neo-Nazi ideals as a whole.

This list does not include pre-1945 organizations founded either before or during World War II; "neo-Nazi" literally means "new Nazi".

Africa

Rhodesia
Rhodesian White People's Party

South Africa
Afrikaner Weerstandsbeweging (Afrikaner Resistance Movement)
Blanke Bevrydingsbeweging (White Liberation Movement)
Ossewabrandwag (Oxwagon Sentinel)
South African National Front

The Americas

North America

Canada
Aryan Guard
Aryan Nations
Heritage Front
Northern Order
Resistance Records

Mexico
Mexican National Socialist Party
Nationalist Front of Mexico
Orden Nacional Socialista Pagano

United States
Atomwaffen Division
American Front
American Nazi Party
Aryan Brotherhood of Texas
Aryan Brotherhood
Aryan Circle
Aryan Nations
Aryan Republican Army
Battalion 14/Connecticut White Wolves
The Daily Stormer
Identity Evropa
Libertarian National Socialist Green Party
Maryland National Socialist Party
National Alliance
National Socialist Liberation Front
Deomcratic Socialists
National Socialist Movement
National Socialist Vanguard
National Vanguard
Nationalist Front
Nationalist Social Club
National States' Rights Party
NSDAP/AO
Patriot Front
Renegade Tribune
The Right Stuff
Rise Above Movement
The Order
Traditionalist Worker Party
Vanguard America
Vanguard News Network
Werewolf 88
White Aryan Resistance
White Devil Social Club
White Order of Thule

Caribbean and South America

Argentina

Partido Nuevo Triunfo
Patriotic Front

Brazil
Brazilian National Socialist Party
Brazilian Revolutionary Nationalist Party
Carecas do ABC (ABC region Skinheads)
Ciudad Libertad de Opinión
Kombat RAC
Valhalla 88

Chile

National Socialist Movement of Chile

Colombia
Tercera Fuerza

Costa Rica
National Socialist Party of Costa Rica
Sociedad Costa Rica de la Lanza Hiperbórea

Ecuador
Legión Blanca (White Legion)

Paraguay

Peru
Andean Peru National Socialism Movement
Tercios Nacional Socialista de Nueva Castilla

Uruguay
Movimiento Joseph Goebbels

Asia

Japan

National Socialist Japanese Workers' Party

Iran

SUMKA (Iran National-Socialist Workers Party)

Israel

 Patrol 36

Mongolia

Tsagaan Khas

Taiwan
National Socialism Association

Europe

Belgium and the Netherlands

Dutch People's Union (Nederlandse Volks-Unie) – Netherlands
Order of Flemish Militants – Flanders
National Alliance – Netherlands
Bloed, Bodem, Eer en Trouw – Flanders
Racial Volunteer Force – Belgium

Bosnia and Herzegovina

Bosnian Movement of National Pride

Bulgaria
White Front ( Бял Фронт )

Czech Republic

Dělnická strana (Workers' Party)
Workers' Party of Social Justice

Denmark

Danmarks Nationalsocialistiske Bevægelse (National Socialist Movement of Denmark) 
Den nordiske modstandsbevægelse (Nordic Resistance Movement)
Party of the Danes

Estonia

Estland88
Feuerkrieg Division

Finland

Atomwaffen Finland
Pohjoismainen Vastarintaliike (Nordic Resistance Movement)
Kohti vapautta

France

 Combat 18
 French and European Nationalist Party
 Federation of National and European Action

Germany

Action Front of National Socialists/National Activists
Atomwaffen Division Deutschland
Autonome Nationalisten
Artgemeinschaft
Blood & Honour
Deutsche Heidnische Front
Der Dritte Weg
Die Rechte
Free German Workers' Party
German Alternative
Gesinnungsgemeinschaft der Neuen Front
Identitarian movement
National Democratic Party of Germany
Nationalist Front (Germany)
National Offensive
National Socialist Underground
Socialist Reich Party
Wiking-Jugend

Greece

 Golden Dawn

Ireland

National Socialist Federation
National Socialist Irish Workers Party (NSIWP)
National Socialist Union of Ireland

Italy

 Avanguardia Nazionale (National Avantgarde) 
 Militia
 Ordine Nuovo (New Order)
 Roman Aryan Order (Ordine Ario Romano)
Ordine Nero
South Tyrolean Liberation Committee
Stieler Groupit

Malta

Imperium Europa

Norway

Norges Nasjonalsosialistiske Bevegelse (National Socialist Movement of Norway)
Nordiske motstandsbevegelsen/Nordiske motstandsrørsla (Nordic Resistance Movement)
Vigrid
Heathen Front
Boot Boys

Portugal

Nova Ordem Social (New Social Order)

Russia

Atomwaffen Division Russland
Crew Sparrows
Ethnic National Union
Format18
Front of National Revolutionary Action
Lincoln-88
National Socialist Society
National Socialist Russian Workers' Party
Navi Society
Northern Brotherhood
Oprichny Dvor
Pamyat Society
People's National Party
Russian Catacomb Church of True Orthodox Christians
Russian National Unity
New Russian National Unity
Russian National Socialist Party
Ryno-Skachevsky gang
Sanitater-88 (The Cleaners)
Schultz-88 
Slavic Union
United Brigade 88
White Society-88

Serbia
 Leviathan Movement
 Krv i čast
 SNP 1389
 Nacionalni stroj (defunct)
 Rasonalisti (defunct)

Spain

 (Revolutionary National Action)
Acción Radical (Radical Action)
Alianza Nacional (National Alliance)
Bases Autónomas (Autonomous Bases)
Blood & Honour
 (Circle of Indo-European Studies)
Círculo Español de Amigos de Europa (Spanish Circle of Friends of Europe)
Democracia Nacional (National Democracy)
Devenir Europeo (European Becoming)
Estado Nacional Europeo (European Nation State)
 (Anti-Systemic Front)
Hermandad Nacional Socialista Armagedón (Armageddon National Socialist Brotherhood)
Hispania Verde (Green Hispania)
Hogar Social Madrid (Social Home Hadrid)
Lo Nuestro (Ours)
Nación y Revolución (Nation and Revolution)
Respuesta Estudiantil (Students' Counterattack)

Sweden

Nordiska motståndsrörelsen (Nordic Resistance Movement)
Nationalsocialistisk front (National Socialist Front)
Svenskarnas parti (Party of the Swedes)
Vitt Ariskt Motstånd (VAM)
Legion Wasa (LW)

Switzerland

Junge Tat
Partei National Orientierter Schweizer (Swiss Nationalist Party)

Slovakia

Ľudová strana – Naše Slovensko (Kotleba – People's Party Our Slovakia)
Slovak Togetherness

Turkey

Nasyonal Aktivitede Zinde İnkişaf (Vigorous Development in National Activity)

United Kingdom

British National Front
British People's Party
Column 88
International Third Position
League of St. George
Northern League
November 9th Society (also known as the British First Party)
National Action (2014)
National Socialist Action Party
National Socialist Movement (1960s)
National Socialist Movement
Sonnenkrieg Division
NF Flag Group
Racial Volunteer Force
White Nationalist Party
White Wolves

Ukraine

 Svoboda
 Right Sector
 Patriots of Ukraine
 National Corps
 S14 (C14)
 Ukrainian National Union (UNU)

Oceania

Australia

Antipodean Resistance 
Aryan Girls
Australian Defence League
Australian National Socialist Party
National Action
National Socialist Network
National Socialist Party of Australia
Patriotic Youth League
True Blue Crew
United Patriots Front

New Zealand

National Socialist Party of New Zealand 
New Zealand National Front 
Right Wing Resistance
Unit 88

International

Atomwaffen Division — Canada, Estonia, Germany, Russia, and the United States
The Base — Australia, Canada, Europe, South Africa and the United States
The Black Order of Pan Europa — Australia, England, Ireland, New Zealand, and Scandinavia
Blood & Honour  — Australia, Austria, Belgium, Bulgaria, Canada, Chile, Croatia, Finland, France, Germany, Greece, Hungary, Italy, the Netherlands, New Zealand, Norway, Poland, Portugal, Serbia, Slovenia, Spain, Sweden, the United Kingdom and the United States
Combat 18 — Argentina, Australia, Austria, Belgium, Canada, Czech Republic, Denmark, France, Germany, Greece, Hungary, Italy, Ireland, Russia, Serbia, South Africa, Sweden, Ukraine, the United Kingdom and the United States
Creativity Alliance — Australia, Eastern Europe, New Zealand, the United Kingdom and the United States
Daily Stormer 
Greenline Front — Argentina, Belarus, Chile, Germany, Italy, Poland, Russia, Serbia, Spain, Switzerland and Ukraine
Hammerskins — Australia, Austria, Canada, France, Germany, Hungary, Italy, Luxembourg, New Zealand, Portugal, Spain, Sweden, Switzerland, the United Kingdom and the United States
National Socialist Club (#131 Crew) — France, Germany, Hungary and the United States
New European Order — Europe-wide
Order of Nine Angles — Australia, Brazil, Egypt, Greece, Ireland, Italy, Montenegro, Portugal, Poland, Russia, Serbia, South Africa, Spain, the United Kingdom,Argentina and the United States
Sadistic Souls Motorcycle Club — Australia, New Zealand, United Kingdom and the United States
Stormfront
Volksfront — Australia, Canada, Germany, the Netherlands, Spain, the United Kingdom and the United States
Women for Aryan Unity — Argentina, Canada, Italy, Spain and the United States
World Union of National Socialists — Belarus, Bulgaria, Canada, Chile, Costa Rica, Finland, France, Greece, Guatemala, Iran, Ireland, Italy, Japan, Norway, Romania, Russia, Serbia, Spain, Sweden, Turkey, Ukraine, the United Kingdom and the United States

See also
 List of fascist movements
 List of fascist movements by country
 List of Ku Klux Klan organizations
 List of organizations designated by the Southern Poverty Law Center as hate groups
 List of white nationalist organizations
 Radical right (Europe)
 Radical right (United States)

References

Neo-fascism
Neo-Nazi